"The Sparrow and His Four Children" is a story from Grimms' Fairy Tales.
The story number was changed from #35 to #157 from the 2nd edition onwards. In Boltes Anmerkungen, he mentions that the tale is from the deep Middle Ages. It was taken from the seventh sermon in Johannes Mathesius Historien von Martin Luther (1563), but it goes back further to Aesop's fables also. In the 1812 Anhang (appendix), it is listed as coming from “Out of Schuppii Schriften. (Fabul. Hans S. 837. 38.).” It is an almost exact transcription of the story from the 1677[?]  published book.

Grimms' Fairy Tales
Fictional birds
Fictional families
Child characters in fairy tales